Teracotona senegalensis is a moth in the  family Erebidae. It was described by Rothschild in 1933. It is found in Senegal and Gambia.

References

Natural History Museum Lepidoptera generic names catalog

Moths described in 1933
Spilosomina